is a Japanese women's professional shogi player ranked 5-dan. She is a former Women's Meijin,  and  title holder.

Promotion history
Yauchi's  promotion history is as follows.
 Women's Professional Apprentice League: 1990
 2-kyū: April 1, 1993
 1-kyū: April 1, 1995
 1-dan: July 10, 1995
 2-dan: April 1, 1997
 3-dan: October 27, 1997
 4-dan: August 3, 2004
 5-dan: February 21, 2014

Note: All ranks are women's professional ranks.

Titles and other championships
Yauchi has appeared in major title matches eighteen times and has won a total of six titles. In addition to major titles, Yauchi has won two other shogi championships.

Major titles

Other championships

Note: Tournaments marked with an asterisk (*) are no longer held or currently suspended.

Awards and honors
Yauchi has received a number of Japan Shogi Association Annual Shogi Awards and other awards in recognition of her accomplishments in shogi and contributions made to Japanese society.

Annual shogi awards
33rd Annual Awards (April 2005March 2006): Woman's Professional of the Year
34th Annual Awards (April 2006March 2007): Women's Professional of the Year
35th Annual Awards (April 2007March 2008): Women's Professional Award

Other awards
 2007, February: 2nd Saitama Kagayaki Ogino Ginko Award
 2008, July: City of Gyōda Tourism Ambassador

References

External links
ShogiHub: Professional Player Info · Yauchi, Rieko

Japanese shogi players
Living people
Women's professional shogi players
Professional shogi players from Saitama Prefecture

1980 births
Women's Meijin
Women's Ōi
Queen (shogi)